Igor Pešić (born 6 October 1982) is a Serbian football defender.

References

External links
 

1982 births
Living people
Sportspeople from Leskovac
Association football defenders
Serbian footballers
FK Zemun players
FK Borac Čačak players
FK Sinđelić Niš players
FK Radnik Surdulica players
Serbian SuperLiga players
Serbian expatriate footballers
Serbian expatriate sportspeople in Iceland
Expatriate footballers in Iceland
Igor Pesic
Igor Pesic
Úrvalsdeild karla (football) players